The 1970–71 Allsvenskan was the 37th season of the top division of Swedish handball. 10 teams competed in the league. SoIK Hellas won the regular season and also won the playoffs to claim their fifth Swedish title. IFK Malmö and IF Start were relegated.

League table

Playoffs

Semifinals
 SoIK Hellas–Redbergslids IK 15–10, 16–13 (SoIK Hellas advance to the finals)
 Västra Frölunda IF–IF Saab 16–17, 19–13 (Västra Frölunda IF advance to the finals)

Finals
 SoIK Hellas–Västra Frölunda IF 13–10, 15–12 (SoIK Hellas champions)

References 

Swedish handball competitions